, known by his stage name Kan (commonly stylized as KAN), is a Japanese singer-songwriter.

In 1983, he joined his first band, which was called Annette, before going solo in 1984. Kan wrote the background music for a 1986 film directed by Nobuhiko Obayashi, and started his major recording career the following year. He is best known for the chart-topping hit "Ai wa Katsu", released as a single in 1990. It sold over 2 million copies and won the 33rd Japan Record Award, bringing the artist into prominence. Subsequently, he spawned five top-ten singles and four top-ten albums on the Japanese record chart during the first half of the 1990s.

As of 2010, Kan has released 33 singles and 15 studio albums. According to the Oricon, he has sold over 4.6 million copies of albums and singles in his home country.

Discography

Singles

Albums
Studio albums

Live albums

Compilation albums

References

1962 births
Japanese composers
Japanese lyricists
Japanese male composers
Japanese male pop singers
Japanese male singer-songwriters
Japanese singer-songwriters
Japanese record producers
Living people
Musicians from Fukuoka Prefecture
People from Fukuoka
Up-Front Group